Shaoxing Urban Rail Line, also known as Shaoxing Tourism New Transit railway or Line S1, is a commuter rail service. It runs from Hangzhou South railway station in Xiaoshan District, Hangzhou to Shangyu railway station in Shangyu District, Shaoxing on the existing Xiaoshan–Ningbo railway. There are also through operation to Ningbo–Yuyao intercity railway.

Between 18 April 2018 and 29 September 2018, the train does not stop at any station except Shaoxing and Shangyu stations. On 29 September 2018, a third station  was open for operation and extending the line with an additional 20 km.

The fare is 6 yuan for Qianqing to Shaoxing, 12 yuan for Shangyu and 8 yuan for Shaoxing to Shangyu.

Stations

Planning
There will be a rename to Shaoxing Urban (Line S1), to Hangzhou Urban (Line H1), due to the government's announcement of merging Shaoxing Metro Line 1 and Hangzhou Metro Line 5. Shaoxing Station would also rename to Hangzhou Station, due to Hangzhou's government announcements of the merge.

References

Rail transport in Zhejiang
Railway lines in China